Sir William George Albert Mack  (1904–1979) was a barrister and judge in Queensland, Australia. He was Chief Justice of the Supreme Court of Queensland from 1966 to 1971. He also served as Administrator of Queensland (deputy for the Governor of Queensland) on two occasions.

Administrator of Queensland 
Mack served as Administrator of Queensland from 10 March 1966 to 21 March 1966 and again on 20 March 1969 to 30 June 1969.

References 

Chief Justices of Queensland
1904 births
1979 deaths
Australian Knights Commander of the Order of the British Empire
Judges of the Supreme Court of Queensland